Arbazh is an urban-type settlement and the administrative center of Arbazhsky District of Kirov Oblast, Russia. Population:

References

Notes

Sources

Urban-type settlements in Kirov Oblast